Henry Yaik (born March 1, 1864 in Detroit, Michigan) was a professional baseball player. He played two games in Major League Baseball for the Pittsburgh Alleghenys in October, 1888, one as a catcher and one as a left fielder. He collected two hits, a walk, and a RBI in seven plate appearances.

Yaik died on September 21, 1935 in Detroit.

External links

Pittsburgh Alleghenys players
Mansfield (minor league baseball) players
Wheeling National Citys players
Wheeling Nailers (baseball) players
Grand Rapids (minor league baseball) players
Davenport Hawkeyes players
Detroit Wolverines (minor league) players
Canton Nadjys players
Detroit Tigers (Western League) players
Ottumwa (minor league baseball) players
Baseball players from Detroit
19th-century baseball players
1864 births
1935 deaths